The men's 105 kilograms weightlifting event at the 2000 Summer Olympics in Sydney, Australia took place at the Sydney Convention and Exhibition Centre on September 25.

Total score was the sum of the lifter's best result in each of the snatch and the clean and jerk, with three lifts allowed for each lift.  In case of a tie, the lighter lifter won; if still tied, the lifter who took the fewest attempts to achieve the total score won.  Lifters without a valid snatch score did not perform the clean and jerk.

Schedule
All times are Australian Eastern Time (UTC+10:00)

Records

Results

References

External links
Official Olympic Report 

Weightlifting at the 2000 Summer Olympics
Men's events at the 2000 Summer Olympics